Ed Pizunski (born October 8, 1954) is a Canadian former professional ice hockey player.

Pizunski began his career at junior level with the Aurora Tigers and also played for the Peterborough Petes and the Toronto Nationals.  He was selected by Kansas City Scouts in round 13 (#203 overall) of the 1974 NHL amateur draft but never played in the NHL. In the 1975–76 WHA season he played in the major leagues when he suited up with the Denver Spurs for one World Hockey Association regular season game.  He also spent parts of that season in the North American Hockey League for the Erie Blades and Broome Dusters and the Central Hockey League for the Tucson Mavericks.

He then signed for the Muskegon Mohawks of the International Hockey League where he became a fan favourite and became widely for his agitating play and fighting style, accumulating 308 penalty minutes in 62 games.  He was also an offensive presence for the team, scoring 19 goals and 22 assists for 41 points.  He then moved back to the CHL with the Fort Worth Texans and also played two games for the Mohawks and four games with the CHL's Phoenix Roadrunners in their only season of existence.  Spells in the CHL and IHL for the Texans, the Fort Wayne Komets and the Indianapolis Checkers was followed by one more season with the Mohawks before retiring due to an injury that he could not overcome.

He currently resides in Muskegon, Michigan where he has a local bar called the Tipsy Toad Tavern.

Regular season and playoffs statistics
Season Team Lge GP G A Pts PIM GP G A Pts PIM

1972-73 Aurora Tigers OPJHL 17 7 8 15 0

1973-74 Peterborough Petes OHA 66 5 18 23 101

1974-75 Toronto Nationals OPJHL 77 0 0 0 200

1975-76 Erie Blades NAHL 10 2 1 3 63

1975-76 Binghamton Dusters NAHL 13 1 2 3 90

1975-76 Tucson Mavericks CHL 2 0 0 0 0

1975-76 Denver Spurs/Ottawa Civics WHA 1 0 0 0 0

1976-77 Muskegon Mohawks IHL 62 19 22 41 308 2 0 0 0 17

1977-78 Muskegon Mohawks IHL 2 2 0 2 6

1977-78 Fort Worth Texans CHL 63 13 18 31 91 10 0 1 1 14

1977-78 Phoenix Roadrunners CHL 4 3 2 5 4

1978-79 Fort Worth Texans CHL 68 29 16 45 62 3 1 1 2 5

1979-80 Fort Wayne Komets IHL 5 2 3 5 4

1979-80 Indianapolis Checkers CHL 60 22 21 43 51 7 2 4 6 4

1980-81 Muskegon Mohawks IHL 37 18 20 38 106

References

External links
 
 
 
 

1954 births
Living people
Canadian ice hockey right wingers
Denver Spurs (WHA) players
Ice hockey people from Toronto
Kansas City Scouts draft picks
Sportspeople from Muskegon, Michigan